is a Japanese race car driver currently competing in the Super GT series. He previously competed in the Formula Nippon and IRL IndyCar Series.

Early career
After winning the Japanese Formula Dream Championship in 2001, Kosuke attracted the attention of former Formula One driver Aguri Suzuki as a teenager and was placed into Suzuki's driver development program, the ARTA Project. He went on to finish 2nd in the 2002 German Formula Three Championship winning 2 races and finished 3rd in the 2003 European Formula Renault V6 Eurocup, winning 3 races before replacing Roger Yasukawa at Super Aguri Fernandez Racing in the Indy Racing League IndyCar Series in 2004.

IRL IndyCar Series

In 2004, he was the Bombardier Rookie of the Year, finishing 14th in points.  He was also the 2004 Bank One Rookie of the Year for the 2004 Indianapolis 500.

In 2005, he again drove for Super Aguri Fernandez Racing, and again finished 14th in the Championship with a best place finish of 6th in the two road course races. He continued with the team in 2006 and finished a career best 13th in points with a best finish of 6th.

For 2007, Autobacs Racing Team Aguri switched allegiance to Panther Racing, teaming Matsuura with Vítor Meira.

During the 2007 IndyCar Series season, Matsuura retired from 6 of the first 11 races and finished no better than 8th in the others. His struggles prompted speculation from media and fans that he might be dropped by Panther Racing, culminating on July 20, 2007, when Speed TV posted an article on its website stating that Matsuura would be immediately replaced by Autobacs Racing Team Aguri Indy Pro Series driver Hideki Mutoh. While the report was incorrect and the article has since been removed, it did little to stop speculation that Matsuura would be replaced following the 2007 season.

On August 5, 2007, Matsuura matched a career best with a 4th-place finish at the Firestone Indy 400 at Michigan. This prompted Indianapolis Motor Speedway Radio Network play-by-play Mike King to suggest that the finish may help him stay in IndyCar Series for the 2008 season. The finish, however, only came in the aftermath of his avoiding a major back straightaway incident involving most of the front half of the field.

For 2008 after longtime sponsors Panasonic switched their sponsorship to Hideki Mutoh of the Andretti Green Racing team in the IndyCar Series, Kosuke returned to Japan to compete in the Formula Nippon Series.

In August 2009, Conquest Racing announced that Matsuura would drive for them at the 2009 Indy Japan 300 in a car sponsored by CLICK Securities Inc. Matsuura finished 17th for the part-time team.

Motorsports career results

American Open-Wheel racing results
(key) (Races in italics indicate fastest lap)

IndyCar Series

Indianapolis 500

Complete Formula Nippon Results
(key) (Races in bold indicate pole position) (Races in italics indicate fastest lap)

Complete Super GT results

References

External links

 Kosuke Matsuura official website

-

1979 births
Living people
Japanese racing drivers
Indianapolis 500 Rookies of the Year
Indianapolis 500 drivers
IndyCar Series drivers
Formula Renault V6 Eurocup drivers
Formula Nippon drivers
German Formula Three Championship drivers
Super GT drivers
Karting World Championship drivers
Japanese IndyCar Series drivers
Prema Powerteam drivers
Dandelion Racing drivers
Conquest Racing drivers
Panther Racing drivers
Nakajima Racing drivers
Signature Team drivers
Team Kunimitsu drivers
Team Aguri drivers